is a 1981 Japanese film in Nikkatsu's Roman porno series, directed by Kichitaro Negishi. Both this film and the earlier (1956) version by Nikkatsu, Crazed Fruit, were based on a novel of the same name by Shintaro Ishihara.

Plot
A working class young man, Tetsuo, who distrusts all rich people, falls in love with a girl, Chika, from an affluent family. He has a difficult time, but love survives despite the problems.

Cast
 Yūji Honma as Tetsuo
 Yuki Ninagawa as Chika
 Eiko Nagashima as Harue
 Eiji Okada as Tono, Chika's step father
 Nobutaka Masutomi as Osawa, Harue's husband
 Kinuko Obata as  Tetsuo's mother

Critical appraisal
The Weissers call the plot "a sadly contrived story" and award it two and a half stars out of four, but laud Yūji Honma's "intense performance" which made the film a major hit for the Nikkatsu studio.

Availability
Crazy Fruit was released as a DVD by Uplink (アップリンク) on May 23, 2003.

Awards and nominations
3rd Yokohama Film Festival 
 Won: Best Director - Kichitaro Negishi

References

External links
 
 

1981 films
Films directed by Kichitaro Negishi
1980s Japanese-language films
Nikkatsu Roman Porno
Nikkatsu films
Pink films
1980s pornographic films
1980s Japanese films